Palestinian Arabic is a dialect continuum of mutually intelligible varieties of Levantine Arabic spoken by most Palestinians in Palestine, Israel and in the Palestinian diaspora.

In two dialect comparison researches, Palestinian Arabic was found to be the closest Arabic dialect to Modern Standard Arabic, mainly the dialect of the people in Gaza Strip.

Further dialects can be distinguished within Palestine, such as spoken in the northern West Bank, that spoken by Palestinians in the Hebron area, which is similar to Arabic spoken by descendants of Palestinian refugees living in Jordan and south-western Syria.

History 
The variations between dialects probably reflect the different historical steps of Arabization of Palestine.

Prior to their adoption of the Arabic language from the seventh century onwards, the inhabitants of Palestine predominantly spoke Jewish Palestinian Aramaic (as witnessed, for example, in Palestinian Jewish and Palestinian Christian literature), as well as Greek (probably in the upper or trader social classes), and some remaining traces of Hebrew. At that time in history, Arabic-speaking people living in the Negev desert or in the Jordan desert beyond Zarqa, Amman or Karak had no significant influence.

Arabic-speaking people such as the Nabataeans tended to adopt Aramaic as a written language as shown in the Nabataean language texts of Petra. Jews and Nabataeans lived side by side in Mahoza and other villages, and their dialects of what they would both have thought of as “Aramaic” would almost certainly have been mutually comprehensible. Additionally, occasional Arabic loan can be found in the Jewish Aramaic documents of the Dead Sea Scrolls.

The adoption of Arabic among the local population occurred most probably in several waves. After the Arabs took control of the area, so as to maintain their regular activity, the upper classes had quickly to get fluency in the language of the new masters who most probably were only few. The prevalence of Northern Levantine features in the urban dialects until the early 20th century, as well as in the dialect of Samaritans in Nablus (with systematic imala of /a:/) tends to show that a first layer of Arabization of urban upper classes could have led to what is now urban Levantine. Then, the main phenomenon could have been the slow countryside shift of Aramaic-speaking villages to Arabic under the influence of Arabized elites, leading to the emergence of the rural Palestinian dialects. This scenario is consistent with several facts.

 The rural forms can be correlated with features also observed in the few Syrian villages where use of Aramaic has been retained up to this day. Palatalisation of /k/ (but of /t/ too), pronunciation [kˤ] of /q/  for instance. Note that the first also exists in Najdi Arabic and Gulf Arabic, but limited to palatal contexts (/k/ followed by i or a). Moreover, those Eastern dialects have [g] or [dʒ] for /q/ .
 The less-evolutive urban forms can be explained by a limitation owed to the contacts urban trader classes had to maintain with Arabic speakers of other towns in Syria or Egypt.
 The Negev Bedouins dialect shares a number of features with bedouin Hejazi dialects (unlike Urban Hejazi).

Differences compared to other Levantine Arabic dialects 

The dialects spoken by the Arabs of the Levant – the Eastern shore of the Mediterranean – or Levantine Arabic, form a group of dialects of Arabic. Arabic manuals for the "Syrian dialect" were produced in the early 20th century, and in 1909 a specific "Palestinean Arabic" manual was published.

The Palestinian Arabic dialects are varieties of Levantine Arabic because they display the following characteristic Levantine features:
 A conservative stress pattern, closer to Classical Arabic than anywhere else in the Arab world.
 The indicative imperfect with a b- prefix
 A very frequent Imāla of the feminine ending in front consonant context (names in -eh).
 A [ʔ] realisation of /q/ in the cities, and a [q] realisation of /q/ by the Druze, and more variants (including [k]) in the countryside.
 A shared lexicon

The noticeable differences between southern and northern forms of Levantine Arabic, such as Syrian Arabic and Lebanese Arabic, are stronger in non-urban dialects. The main differences between Palestinian and northern Levantine Arabic are as follows:

 Phonetically, Palestinian dialects differ from Lebanese regarding the classical diphthongs /aj/ and /aw/, which have simplified to [eː] and [o:] in Palestinian dialects as in Western Syrian, while in Lebanese they have retained a diphthongal pronunciation: [eɪ] and [oʊ].
 Palestinian dialects differ from Western Syrian as far as short stressed /i/ and /u/ are concerned: in Palestinian they keep a more or less open [ɪ] and [ʊ] pronunciation, and are not neutralised to [ə] as in Syrian.
 The Lebanese and Syrian dialects are more prone to imāla of /a:/ than the Palestinian dialects are. For instance شتا 'winter' is ['ʃɪta] in Palestinian but ['ʃəte] in Lebanese and Western Syrian. Some Palestinian dialects ignore imala totally (e.g. Gaza). Those dialects that prominently demonstrate imāla of /a:/ (e.g. Nablus) are distinct among Palestinian dialects.
 In morphology, the plural personal pronouns are إحنا['ɪħna] 'we', همه['hʊmme] also hunne [هنه] 'they',[ كو] [ku] كم-[-kʊm] 'you',  هم- [-hʊm] هني [henne]'them' in Palestinian, while they are in Syria/Lebanon نحنا['nɪħna] 'we', هنه['hʊnne] 'they', كن-[-kʊn] 'you', هن- [-hʊn] 'them'. The variants كو [-kʊ] 'you', ـهن [-hen] 'them', and هنه [hinne] 'they' are used in Northern Palestinian. 
 The conjugation of the imperfect 1st and 3rd person masculine has different prefix vowels. Palestinians say بَكتب['baktʊb] 'I write' بَشوف[baʃuːf] 'I see' where Lebanese and Syrians say بِكتب['bəktʊb] and بْشوف[bʃuːf]. In the 3rd person masculine, Palestinians say بِكتب['bɪktʊb] 'He writes'  where Lebanese and Western Syrians say بيَكتب['bjəktʊb]. 
 Hamza-initial verbs commonly have an [o:] prefix sound in the imperfect in Palestinian. For example, Classical Arabic has اكل /akala/ 'to eat' in the perfect tense, and آكل /aːkulu/ with [a:] sound in the first person singular imperfect. The common equivalent in Palestinian Arabic is  اكل /akal/ in the perfect, with imperfect 1st person singular بوكل /boːkel/ (with the indicative b- prefix.) Thus, in the Galilee and Northern West Bank, the colloquial for the verbal expression, "I am eating" or "I eat" is commonly ['bo:kel] / ['bo:tʃel], rather than ['ba:kʊl] used in the Western Syrian dialect. Note however that ['ba:kel] or even ['ba:kʊl] are used in the South of Palestine.
 The conjugation of the imperative is different too. 'Write!' is اكتب ['ʊktʊb] in Palestinian, but كتوب [ktoːb], with different stress and vowel and length, in Lebanese and Western Syrian.
 For the negation of verbs and prepositional pseudo-verbs, Palestinian, like Egyptian, typically suffixes ش [ʃ] on top of using the preverb negation /ma/, e.g. 'I don't write' is مابكتبش [ma bak'tʊbʃ] in Palestinian, but مابكتب [ma 'bəktʊb] in Northern Levantine (although some areas in southern Lebanon utilise the ش [ʃ] suffix). However, unlike Egyptian, Palestinian allows for ش [ʃ] without the preverb negation /ma/ in the present tense, e.g. بكتبش [bak'tubɪʃ]. 
 In vocabulary, Palestinian is closer to Lebanese than to Western Syrian, e.g. 'is not' is مش [məʃ] in both Lebanese and Palestinian (although in a few villages مهوش [mahuʃ] and مهيش [mahiʃ], which are found in Maltese and North African dialects, are used) while it is مو [mu] in Syrian; 'How?' is كيف [kiːf] in Lebanese and Palestinian while it is شلون [ʃloːn] in Syrian (though كيف is also used) . However, Palestinian also shares items with Egyptian Arabic, e.g. 'like' (prep.) is زي [zejj] in Palestinian in addition to مثل [mɪtl], as found in Syrian and Lebanese Arabic.

There are also typical Palestinian words that are shibboleths in the Levant. 
 A frequent Palestinian إشي ['ɪʃi] 'thing, something', as opposed to  شي [ʃi] in Lebanon and Syria. 
 Besides common Levantine  هلق ['hallaʔ] 'now', Central Rural dialects around Jerusalem and Ramallah use هالقيت [halke:t] (although [halʔe:t] is used in some cities such as Tulkarm, Hebron, and Nablus alongside هلق[hallaʔ] (both from هالوقت /halwaqt/ ) and northern Palestinians use إسا['ɪssɑ], إساع ['ɪssɑʕ], and هسة [hassɑ](from الساعة/ɪs:ɑ:ʕɑ/). Peasants in the southern West Bank also use هالحين [halaħin] or هالحينة [halħina] (both from هذا الحين [haːða ‘alħin])
Some rural Palestinians use بقى [baqa] (meaning 'remained' in MSA) as a verb to be alongside the standard كان [ka:n] ([ka:na in MSA)

Social and geographic dialect structuration
As is very common in Arabic-speaking countries, the dialect spoken by a person depends on both the region he/she comes from, and the social group he/she belongs to.

Palestinian urban dialects
The Urban ('madani') dialects resemble closely northern Levantine Arabic dialects, that is, the colloquial variants of western Syria and Lebanon. This fact, that makes the urban dialects of the Levant remarkably homogeneous, is probably due to the trading network among cities in the Ottoman Levant, or to an older Arabic dialect layer closer to the qeltu dialects still spoken in Upper Mesopotamia.

Urban dialects are characterised by the [ʔ] (hamza) pronunciation of ق qaf, the simplification of interdentals as dentals plosives, i.e.  ث as [t], ذ as [d] and both  ض and  ظ as [dˤ]. Note however that in borrowings from Modern Standard Arabic, these interdental consonants are realised as dental sibilants, i.e.  ث as [s], ذ as [z] and ظ as [zˤ] but ض is kept as [dˤ]. The Druzes have a dialect that may be classified with the Urban ones, with the difference that they keep the uvular pronunciation of ق qaf as [q]. The urban dialects also ignore the difference between masculine and feminine in the plural pronouns انتو ['ɪntu] is both 'you' (masc. plur.) and 'you' (fem. plur.), and  ['hʊmme] is both 'they' (masc.) and 'they' (fem.)

Rural varieties
Rural or farmer ('fallahi') variety is retaining the interdental consonants, and is closely related with rural dialects in the outer southern Levant and in Lebanon. They keep the distinction between masculine and feminine plural pronouns, e.g. انتو ['ɪntu] is 'you' (masc.) while انتن ['ɪntɪn] is 'you' (fem.), and همه ['hʊmme] is 'they' (masc.) while هنه ['hɪnne] is 'they' (fem.).  The three rural groups in the region are the following:

 North Galilean rural dialect - does not feature the k > tʃ palatalisation, and many of them have kept the [q] realisation of ق (e.g. Maghār, Tirat Carmel). In the very north, they announce dialect thats is more closely to the Northern Levantine  dialects with n-ending pronouns such as كن-[-kʊn] 'you', هن- [-hʊn] 'them' (Tarshiha, etc.).
 Central rural Palestinian (From Nazareth to Bethlehem, including Jaffa countryside) exhibits a very distinctive feature with pronunciation of ك 'kaf' as [tʃ] 'tshaf' (e.g. كفية 'keffieh' as [tʃʊ'fijje]) and ق 'qaf' as pharyngealised /k/ i.e.  [kˤ] 'kaf' (e.g. قمح 'wheat' as [kˤɑmᵊħ]). This k > tʃ sound change is not conditioned by the surrounding sounds in Central Palestinian. This combination is unique in the whole Arab world, but could be related to the 'qof' transition to 'kof' in the Aramaic dialect spoken in Ma'loula, north of Damascus.
 Southern outer rural Levantine Arabic (to the south of an Isdud/Ashdod-Bethlehem line) has k > tʃ only in presence of front vowels (ديك 'rooster' is [di:tʃ] in the singular but the plural ديوك 'roosters' is [dju:k] because u prevents /k/ from changing to [tʃ]). In this dialect ق is not pronounced as [k] but instead as [g]. This dialect is actually very similar to northern Jordanian (Ajloun, Irbid) and the dialects of Syrian Hauran. In Southern rural Palestinian, the feminine ending often remains [a].

Bedouin variety
The Bedouins of Southern Levant use two different ('badawi') dialects in Galilee and the Negev. The Negev desert Bedouins, who are also present in Palestine and Gaza Strip use a dialect closely related to those spoken in the Hijaz, and in the Sinai. Unlike them, the Bedouins of Galilee speak a dialect related to those of the Syrian Desert and Najd, which indicates their arrival to the region is relatively recent. The Palestinian resident Negev Bedouins, who are present around Hebron and Jerusalem have a specific vocabulary, they maintain the interdental consonants, they do not use the ش-[-ʃ] negative suffix, they always realise ك /k/ as [k] and ق /q/ as [g], and distinguish plural masculine from plural feminine pronouns, but with different forms as the rural speakers.

Current evolutions
On the urban dialects side, the current trend is to have urban dialects getting closer to their rural neighbours, thus introducing some variability among cities in the Levant. For instance, Jerusalem used to say as Damascus ['nɪħna] ("we") and ['hʊnne] ("they") at the beginning of the 20th century, and this has moved to the more rural ['ɪħna] and ['hʊmme] nowadays. This trend was probably initiated by the partition of the Levant of several states in the course of the 20th century.

The Rural description given above is moving nowadays with two opposite trends. On the one hand, urbanisation gives a strong influence power to urban dialects. As a result, villagers may adopt them at least in part, and Beduin maintain a two-dialect practice. On the other hand, the individualisation that comes with urbanisation make  people feel more free to choose the way they speak than before, and in the same way as some will use typical Egyptian or Lebanese features as [le:] for [le:ʃ], others may use typical rural features such as the rural realisation [kˤ] of ق as a pride reaction against the stigmatisation of this pronunciation.

Phonology

Consonants 

 Sounds  are mainly heard in both the rural and Bedouin dialects. Sounds  and / are mainly heard in the urban dialects.  is heard in the rural dialects.
  is heard in the Bedouin dialects, and may also be heard as a uvular .
In some rural dialects  has replaced  as a phoneme.
  can also be heard as velar  among some rural dialects.
  can be heard as  within devoiced positions.

Vowels 

  are heard as  when following and preceding a pharyngealized consonant.

  can be lowered to  when in lax form, or within the position of a post-velar consonant.

Specific aspects of the vocabulary
As Palestinian Arabic is spoken in the heartland of the Semitic languages, it has kept many typical Semitic words. For this reason, it is relatively easy to guess how Modern Standard Arabic words map onto Palestinian Arabic Words. The  list (Swadesh list) of basic word of Palestinian Arabic  available on the Wiktionary (see external links below) may be used for this. However, some words are not transparent mappings from MSA, and deserve a description. This is due either to meaning changes in Arabic along the centuries - while MSA keeps the Classical Arabic meanings - or to the adoption of non-Arabic words (see below). Note that this section focuses on Urban Palestinian unless otherwise specified.

Prepositional pseudo verbs

The words used in Palestinian to express the basic verbs 'to want', 'to have', 'there is/are' are called prepositional pseudo verbs because they share all the features of verbs but are constructed with a preposition and a suffix pronoun.

 there is, there are is فيه [fi] in the imperfect, and كان فيه [ka:n fi] in the perfect.
 To want is formed with bɪdd + suffix pronouns and to have is formed with ʕɪnd + suffix pronouns. In the imperfect they are

In the perfect, they are preceded by كان [kaːn], e.g. we wanted is كان بدنا [kaːn 'bɪddna].

Relative clause

As in most forms of colloquial Arabic, the relative clause markers of Classical Arabic (الذي،  التي، اللذان، اللتان، الذين and اللاتي) have been simplified to a single form إللي ['ʔɪlli].

Interrogatives pronouns

The main Palestinian interrogative pronouns (with their Modern Standard Arabic counterparts) are the following ones.

Note that it is tempting to consider the long [iː] in مين [miːn] 'who?' as an influence of ancient Hebrew מי [miː] on Classical Arabic من [man], but it could be as well an analogy with the long vowels of the other interrogatives.

Marking Indirect Object

In Classical Arabic, the indirect object was marked with the particle /li-/ ('for', 'to'). For instance 'I said to him' was قلت له ['qultu 'lahu] and 'I wrote to her' was كتبت لها [ka'tabtu la'ha:]. In Palestinian Arabic, the Indirect Object marker is still based on the consonant /l/, but with more complex rules, and two different vocal patterns. The basic form before pronouns is a clitic [ɪll-], that always bears the stress, and to which person pronouns are suffixed. The basic form before nouns is [la]. For instance
 ... قلت لإمك ['ʔʊlət la-'ɪmmak ...] 'I told your mother ...'
 ...اعطينا المكتوب لمدير البنك [ʔɑʕtˤeːna l maktuːb la mʊ'diːɾ ɪl baŋk] 'We gave the letter to the bank manager'
 ... قلت إله [ʔʊlt-  'ɪll-o ...] 'I told him ...'
 ... قلت إلها [ʔʊlt- 'ɪl(l)-ha ...] 'I told her ...'
 ... كتبت إلّي [katabt- 'ɪll-i ...] 'You wrote me ...'

Borrowings

Palestinians have borrowed words from the many languages they have been in contact with throughout history. For example,
 from Aramaic -  especially in the place names, for instance there are several mountains called جبل الطور  ['ʒabal ɪtˤ tˤuːɾ] where طور [tˤuːɾ] is just the Aramaic טור for 'mountain'.
 Oda for 'room' from Turkish oda.
 Kundara (or qundara) for 'shoe' from Turkish kundura.
 Dughri (دُغْرِيّ) for 'forward' from Turkish doğru
 Suffix -ji denoting a profession eg. kahwaji (café waiter) from Turkish kahveci. And sufraji,  sabonji, etc.

 Latin left words in Levantine Arabic, not only those as قصر [ʔasˤɾ] < castrum 'castle' or قلم [ʔalam] < calamus which are also known in MSA, but also words such as طاولة [tˤa:wle] < tabula 'table', which are known in the Arab world.
 from Italian بندورة [ban'do:ra] < pomodoro 'tomato'
 from French كتو ['ketto] < gâteau 'cake'
 from English بنشر ['banʃar] < puncture, [trɪkk] < truck
 From Hebrew, especially the Arab citizens of Israel have adopted many Hebraisms, like     ("we did it!" - used as sports cheer) which has no real equivalent in Arabic. According to social linguist Dr. David Mendelson from Givat Haviva's Jewish-Arab Center for Peace, there is an adoption of words from Hebrew in Arabic spoken in Israel where alternative native terms exist. According to linguist Mohammed Omara, of Bar-Ilan University some researchers call the Arabic spoken by Israeli Arabs Arabrew (in Hebrew, ערברית "Aravrit"). The list of words adopted contain: 
 رمزور [ram'zo:r] from  'traffic light'
 شمنيت ['ʃamenet] from  'sour cream'
 بسدر [be'seder] from  'O.K, alright'
 كوخفيت [koxa'vi:t] from  'asterisk'
 بلفون [bele'fo:n] from  'cellular phone'.

Palestinians in the Palestinian territories sometimes refer to their brethren in Israel as "the b'seder Arabs" because of their adoption of the Hebrew word בְּסֵדֶר [beseder] for 'O.K.', (while Arabic is ماشي[ma:ʃi]). However words like    'traffic light' and   'roadblock' have become a part of the general Palestinian vernacular.

The 2009 film Ajami is mostly spoken in Palestinian-Hebrew Arabic.

Interpretations of "Arabrew" are often colored by non-linguistic political and cultural factors, but how contact with Hebrew is realized has been  studied, and has been described in linguistic terms and in terms of how it varies. "Arabrew" as spoken  by Palestinians and more generally Arab citizens of Israel has been described as classical codeswitching without much structural effect While the codeswitching by the majority of Arab or Palestinian citizens of Israel who are Christian or Muslim from the North or the Triangle is described as limited, more intense codeswitching is seen among Arabs who live in Jewish-majority settlements as well as Bedouin (in the South) who serve in the army, although this variety can still be called codeswitching, and does not involve any significant structural change deviating from the non-Hebrew influenced norm. For the most part among all Christian and Muslim Arabs in Israel, the impact of Hebrew contact on Palestinian Arabic is limited to borrowing of nouns, mostly for specialist  vocabulary, plus a few discourse markers. However, this does not apply to the Arabic spoken by the Israeli Druze, which has been documented as manifesting much more intense contact effects, including the mixture of Arabic and Hebrew words within syntactic clauses, such as the use of a Hebrew preposition for an Arabic element and vice versa, and the adherence to gender and number agreement between Arabic and Hebrew elements (i.e. a Hebrew possessive adjective must agree with the gender of the Arabic noun it describes). While Hebrew definite articles can only be used for Hebrew nouns, Arabic definite articles are used for Hebrew nouns and are, in fact, the most common DP structure.

Vowel harmony
The most often cited example of vowel harmony in Palestinian Arabic is in the present tense conjugations of verbs. If the root vowel is rounded, then the roundness spreads to other high vowels in the prefix. Vowel harmony in PA is also found in the nominal verbal domain. Suffixes are immune to rounding harmony, and vowels left of the stressed syllable do not have vowel harmony.

Palestinian Arabic has a regressive vowel harmony for these present tense conjugations: if the verb stem's main vowel is /u/, then the vowel in the prefix is also /u/, else the vowel is /i/. This is compared with standard Arabic (which can be seen as representative of other Arabic dialects), where the vowel in the prefix is consistently /a/.

Examples:

‘he understands’: PA ‘bifham’ (MSA, or standard Arabic, ‘yafhamu’)
‘he studies’: PA ‘budrus’ (MSA, ‘yadrusu’)
‘she wears’: PA ‘btilbis’ (MSA, ‘talbisu’)
‘she writes’: PA ‘btuktub’ (MSA, ‘taktubu’)
‘oven’: PA ‘furun’ (MSA, ‘furn’)
‘wedding’: PA ‘Urus’ (MSA,‘'urs'’)

Publications
The Gospel of Mark was published in Palestinian Arabic in 1940, with the Gospel of Matthew and the Letter of James published in 1946.

See also
Palestine
Varieties of Arabic
Jordanian Arabic
Syrian Arabic
Egyptian Arabic
Music of Palestine
Arabic language in Israel
Academy of the Arabic Language in Israel

References

Further reading
P. Behnstedt, Wolfdietrich Fischer and Otto Jastrow, Handbuch der Arabischen Dialekte. 2nd ed. Wiesbaden: Harrassowitz 1980
Haim Blanc, Studies in North Palestinian Arabic: linguistic inquiries among the Druzes of Western Galilee and Mt. Carmel. Oriental notes and studies, no. 4. Jerusalem: Typ. Central Press 1953.
J. Blau, "Syntax des palästinensischen Bauerndialektes von Bir-Zet: auf Grund der Volkserzahlungen aus Palastina von Hans Schmidt und Paul kahle". Walldorf-Hessen: Verlag fur Orientkunde H. Vorndran 1960.
J. Cantineau, "Remarques sur les parlés de sédentaires syro-libano-palestiniens", in: Bulletin de la Société de Linguistique de Paris 40 (1938), pp. 80–89.
R. L. Cleveland, "Notes on an Arabic Dialect of Southern Palestine", in: Bulletin of the American Society of Oriental Research 185 (1967), pp. 43–57.
Olivier Durand, Grammatica di arabo palestinese: il dialetto di Gerusalemme, Rome: Università di Roma La Sapienza 1996.
Yohanan Elihai, Dictionnaire de l’arabe parlé palestinien: français-arabe. Jerusalem: Typ. Yanetz 1973.
Yohanan Elihai, The olive tree dictionary: a transliterated dictionary of conversational Eastern Arabic (Palestinian). Washington, DC: Kidron Pub. 2004
Elias N. Haddad, "Manual of Palestinian Arabic". Jerusalem: Syrisches Weisenhaus 1909.
Moin Halloun, A Practical Dictionary of the Standard Dialect Spoken in Palestine. Bethlehem University 2000.
Moin Halloun, Lehrbuch ds Palästinensisch-Arabischen. Heidelberg 2001.
Moin Halloun, Spoken Arabic for Foreigners. An Introduction to the Palestinian Dialect. Vol. 1 & 2. Jerusalem 2003.
Arye Levin, A Grammar of the Arabic Dialect of Jerusalem [in Hebrew]. Jerusalem: Magnes Press 1994
M. Piamenta, Studies in the Syntax of Palestinian Arabic. Jerusalem 1966.
Frank A. Rice and Majed F. Sa'ed, Eastern Arabic: an introduction to the spoken Arabic of Palestine, Syria and Lebanon. Beirut: Khayat's 1960.
Frank A. Rice, Eastern Arabic-English, English-Eastern Arabic: dictionary and phrasebook for the spoken Arabic of Jordan, Lebanon, Palestine/Israel and Syria. New York: Hippocrene Books 1998
H. Schmidt & P. E. Kahle, "Volkserzählungen aus Palaestina, gesammelt bei den Bauern von Bir-Zet". Göttingen: Vandenhoeck & Ruprecht 1918.
 
Kimary N. Shahin, Palestinian Rural Arabic (Abu Shusha dialect)''. 2nd ed. University of British Columbia. LINCOM Europa, 2000

External links

 
 The Arabic dialect of central Palestine
 Arabic in Jordan (Palestinian dialect)
 "Phonological change and variation in Palestinian Arabic as spoken inside Israel", Dissertation Proposal by Uri Horesh, Philadelphia, December 12, 2003 (PDF)
 The Corpus of Spoken Palestinian Arabic (CoSPA), project description by Otto Jastrow.

Languages of the State of Palestine
South Levantine Arabic
Languages of Israel